Fernando Perez (born April 23, 1983) is an American former professional baseball outfielder, a professional writer, and current MLB coach for the San Francisco Giants. He played in Major League Baseball (MLB) for the Tampa Bay Rays in 2008 and 2009.

Early life
Born in Elizabeth, New Jersey. Perez eventually moved with his family to West Windsor Township, New Jersey, where he attended elementary and middle school and played little league. Perez played youth travel soccer for the Pirates and the West End Warriors of Mercer County, New Jersey, winners of several state cup championships during his tenure. Perez attended the prestigious Peddie School, a private high school in Hightstown, New Jersey, where he was a standout member of the varsity baseball team.

College
Perez went to Columbia University where he studied American studies and creative writing, training he later used to become the first Major League Baseball player published in Poetry magazine. Perez is a fan of poets Robert Creeley and John Ashbery as well as author Tom Miller.

At Columbia, he played baseball for three years before being selected by the Tampa Bay Devil Rays in the 7th round (195th overall) of the 2004 Major League Baseball draft.

Professional career

Tampa Bay Rays system

From April 4-October 4, 2007, he wrote a journal for milb.com.

In his five season in the minors through 2008, he batted .289 with a .403 slugging percentage.

In the majors 
Perez was called up by the Tampa Bay Rays on August 31, 2008. In his first major league at bat. on September 5, Perez recorded a single off Toronto Blue Jays closer B. J. Ryan. His first major league home run came in front of his hometown fans on September 14, at Yankee Stadium. In 60 at bats, he batted .250.

He contributed to the Rays reaching their first World Series by scoring the winning run as a pinch runner in Game 2 of the ALCS against the Boston Red Sox, tagging at third and scoring on a short fly ball by B. J. Upton in the bottom of the 11th inning.

During 2009 spring training, Perez was injured on March 10 during a game against the Toronto Blue Jays after trying to make a diving catch. He left the game, and missed significant time during the 2009 season.

He was activated from the disabled list and was called up in the roster expansions and filled in for the injured B. J. Upton in September. He was one of six Ivy Leaguers on major league rosters at the beginning of the 2009 season.

Back to the minors 
Perez spent the 2010 season with the AAA Durham Bulls.

Chicago Cubs system 
On January 8, 2011, Perez was traded to the Chicago Cubs with Matt Garza and minor league pitcher Zac Rosscup for Hak-Ju Lee, Brandon Guyer, Robinson Chirinos, Chris Archer and Cubs outfielder Sam Fuld. He was released on July 8, after hitting .238 for the AAA Iowa Cubs and seeing no time in the majors in 2011.

New York Mets system
Perez signed a minor league contract with the New York Mets on July 18, 2011, and was assigned to the Triple-A Buffalo Bisons.

Independent minor leagues and retirement 
Perez became a free agent after the 2011 season and did not sign with any team, eventually taking the 2012 season off.

In 2013, he played for the  Sugar Land Skeeters and the Lancaster Barnstormers of the independent Atlantic League. He retired from baseball in 2014.

Coaching 
Ahead of the 2021 season, Perez was hired by the San Francisco Giants as a video coach, and as of 2022 is the director of video coaching.

Baseball analyst 
In 2015 Perez signed on as a baseball analyst with MLB.com. Perez contributes a column called "Recovering Ballplayer" to Vice Sports. While injured during the 2009 season, Perez also wrote a baseball blog for The New York Times.

References

External links

 Perez bio at the Poetry Foundation website
 Fernando Perez 2007 minor league journal
 "Recovering Ballplayer" column at Vice Sports
 Perez interview at Sports Marketing & PR Roundup blog

1983 births
Living people
Águilas de Mexicali players
American expatriate baseball players in Mexico
American sportspeople of Cuban descent
Baseball players from New Jersey
Buffalo Bisons (minor league) players
Charlotte Stone Crabs players
Columbia Lions baseball players
Durham Bulls players
Gulf Coast Rays players
Hudson Valley Renegades players
Iowa Cubs players
Lancaster Barnstormers players
Leones del Caracas players
American expatriate baseball players in Venezuela
Major League Baseball outfielders
Montgomery Biscuits players
Peddie School alumni
People from West Windsor, New Jersey
Southwest Michigan Devil Rays players
Sportspeople from Elizabeth, New Jersey
Sugar Land Skeeters players
Tampa Bay Rays players
Visalia Oaks players